Choco or Chocó may refer to:
El Chocó, a region in western Colombia and adjacent parts of Panama and Ecuador
Chocó–Darién moist forests
Pacific/Chocó natural region
Chocó Department, Colombian administrative region
Choco languages, family of Native American languages, in Colombia and Panama
Chocó people, former name of the Embera-Wounaan, a group of semi-nomadic Indians in Panama
Guilherme Choco (born 1990), Brazilian footballer

Choco may also be an alternative name for:
A shortening of "chocolate" in Korean and Japanese (in transcriptions into English)
A shortening of the phrase "chocolate soldier", a derogatory name for soldiers of the Australian Army Reserve
Chayote, edible plant
Chocobo, fictional bird, in various Square Enix Final Fantasy games
 Choco District
Choco pie, a snack cake
Choco Taco
Mark Williams (Australian footballer, born 1958), former coach of the Port Adelaide Football Club
Choco (footballer, born 4 January 1990), João Guilherme Estevão da Silva, Brazilian football striker
Choco (footballer, born 18 January 1990), Guilherme de Souza, Brazilian football right-back

See also
Choko (disambiguation)
Chocosis
Cocoa bean